Mangalmé is a sub-prefecture of Guéra Region in Chad.

Demographics 
Ethnic composition by canton in 2016:

Moubi Zarga Canton (population: 38,800; villages: 74):

References 

Populated places in Chad